Finn Jarle Sæle (born 10 June 1947) is a Norwegian editor, activist, theologian and former priest. Sæle is the editor of the Bergen-based Christian conservative weekly newspaper Norge Idag, which he founded after he was fired as editor of the Christian newspaper Dagen in 1999 due to internal conflicts, a position he held since 1985.

Sæle has been noted as a Christian right activist, particularly on the conflicts in the Middle East, abortion and same-sex marriage. He has arranged rallies in support of Israel, and advocated for newspapers to publish the Jyllands-Posten Muhammad cartoons. He has long supported anti-abortion activist priests Børre Knudsen, and Ludvig Nessa, a student friend. Sæle is married to former Christian Democratic member of parliament Anita Apelthun Sæle. They have four children.

References

1947 births
Living people
Norwegian newspaper editors
Norwegian anti-abortion activists
Norwegian theologians
Norwegian priests